, also known as Shizuki Castle, was a Japanese castle located in Hagi, Yamaguchi Prefecture.

Hagi Castle was built in 1604 at the beginning of the Edo period as the main castle of the Mōri clan, and served as the seat of the Chōshū Domain for over 250 years until 1863. Hagi Castle was demolished in 1874 shortly after the Meiji Restoration.

Hagi Castle's former site has been designated a UNESCO World Heritage Site since July 2015.

History 
Hagi Castle was constructed in 1604 by Mōri Terumoto, the head of the Mōri clan, as his new seat after defeat at the Battle of Sekigahara in 1600. The Mōri had ruled most of the Chūgoku region by the late Sengoku period, and Terumoto had recently constructed Hiroshima Castle from which to rule it. However, Terumoto had joined the western alliance against Tokugawa Ieyasu and subsequently lost most of his holdings, including Hiroshima Castle, and was forced west into the provinces of Suō and Nagato. Following the establishment of the Tokugawa shogunate, Terumoto applied to build new castles in present-day Hagi, Yamaguchi, and Mitajiri, with only Hagi being accepted because of its strategic location on the Sea of Japan coast. Hagi Castle was unusual as it was constructed mainly at the base of Mount Shizuki, though a few defences are located on the mountain. As the seat of the Mōri, the castle served as the de facto capital of the Chōshū Domain.

In 1863, Mōri Takachika moved the seat of the Mōri to Yamaguchi Castle without permission of the shogunate during the Bakumatsu.

In 1874, much of Hagi Castle was demolished, leaving little but ruins, as part of a wave of castle demolitions following the Meiji Restoration.

Today 
Hagi Castle is a National Historic site. It was registered as a UNESCO World Heritage Site on July 5, 2015 as part of the Sites of Japan’s Meiji Industrial Revolution: Iron and Steel, Shipbuilding and Coal Mining. It is registered as part of Hagi's Castle Town.

Sources

Literature

External links 

Castles in Yamaguchi Prefecture
Historic Sites of Japan
Demolished buildings and structures in Japan
Buildings and structures demolished in 1874